Karl Hopf (March 26, 1863 – March 23, 1914) was a German serial killer. He was sentenced to death on January 19, 1914 for murdering his wives, father and daughter, as well as attempting to murder other people from the Frankfurt jury.

Life 
Karl Hopf attended the Musterschule and left after the Untersekunda. He began work as a pharmacist in London, and lived temporarily in Casablanca and India. There he trained in fencing, which he mastered to perfection. At the turn of the century, he ran a kennel in Niederhöchstadt, today part of Eschborn. For one of his dogs, he scored a high amount of 10,000 gold marks for sale at one time.

Murders 
In 1902, he married his first wife, Josefa Henel, from Niederhöchstadt. She died the same year on November 28 after a short illness. From her life insurance he received 20,000 gold marks. He then married Auguste Christine, née Schneider, who also began suffering from health problems. She divorced Hopf, left him and died soon afterwards. However, Hopf was unable to collect the insurance of 30,000 gold marks on her. His daughter, Elsa, died in 1906.

In the following years Hopf appeared in variety shows under the pseudonym "Athos" as a champion in fencing.

In 1912, he married Dresden native Wally Siewec in London. They insured themselves with 80,000 gold marks "on mutuality". His third wife soon became ill with severe gastrointestinal disease. She was treated at the Deaconess Hospital in Frankfurt, where she began to feel better. The toxicology specialist, Dr. Rossmann, recognized symptoms of severe poisoning and consulted forensic physician Georg Popp.

Investigations 
As a result, a search of Hopf's home revealed large amounts of various highly concentrated poisons, including arsenic, digitalis and live cultures of typhoid and cholera bacilli. He was arrested on April 14, 1913. Hopf had brought a bottle of cyanide with him, but police seized it from him.

Trial 
The trial in front of the jury in Frankfurt and lasted from January 9 to 19, 1914, and was very well received by the public. More than 64 witnesses and experts were invited and heard. At the trial it came to light that Hopf had murdered his father, first wife, illegitimate child and his daughter Elsa from his second marriage with poison. He secretly, partially over long periods of time, poisoned all the murdered, mostly hidden in foods and drinks.

In an exhumation of the bodies of all his deceased relatives, Popp succeeded for the first time in criminal history to scientifically lead the poison detection in the bones and body parts.

Execution 
After he was sentenced to death, Karl Hopf was guillotined on March 23, 1914, in the courtyard of the Royal Prison Preugesheim.

See also 

 List of serial killers by country

External links 

 Historical Society Eschborn about Karl Hopf
 City of Frankfurt about Georg Popp

References 

1863 births
1914 deaths
1900s murders in Germany 
1902 murders in Germany
1906 murders in Germany
1912 murders in Germany 
Criminals from Hesse
Executed German serial killers
Filicides in Germany
Male serial killers
Murderers for life insurance money
Patricides
People from Frankfurt
People convicted of murder by Germany
People executed by Germany by guillotine
People executed by the German Empire
Poisoners
Uxoricides